Nottinghamshire County Cricket Club is one of eighteen first-class county clubs within the domestic cricket structure of England and Wales. It represents the historic county of Nottinghamshire. The club's limited overs team is called the Notts Outlaws.

The county club was founded in 1841, although teams had played first-class cricket under the Nottinghamshire name since 1835. The county club has always held first-class status. Nottinghamshire have competed in the County Championship since the official start of the competition in 1890 and have played in every top-level elite domestic cricket competition in England.

The club plays most of its home games at the Trent Bridge cricket ground in West Bridgford, Nottingham, which is also a venue for Test matches. The club has played matches at numerous other venues in the county.

History
Nottingham Cricket Club is known to have played matches from 1771 onwards and 15 matches involving this side have been awarded first-class status from 1826. A single first-class match was played by a combined Nottinghamshire and Leicestershire side in 1803 but the first Nottinghamshire sides played in 1829. Eight matches played by this side between 1835 and 1840 have first-class status.

The formal creation of Nottinghamshire County Cricket Club was enacted in March or April 1841 (the exact date has been lost). William Clarke established Trent Bridge as a cricket venue adjacent to the public house he ran. It was Clarke's successor as Nottinghamshire captain, George Parr, who first captained a united England touring team in 1859.  The club elected its first president, Sir Henry Bromley, in 1869. Early professional greats such as Alfred Shaw and Arthur Shrewsbury ensured that Notts were a force in the period before 1900. Thanks largely to the outstanding bowling combination of Tom Wass and Albert Hallam, the county won the County Championship in 1907 when George Gunn, John Gunn and Wilfred Payton were also prominent.

Between the wars Notts enjoyed the services of the famous bowlers Harold Larwood and Bill Voce. Strong batting from George Gunn, Arthur Carr and Dodger Whysall saw them emerge as champions in 1929 after losing the title on the final day of the season in 1927. Prior to the second war, opening batsman Walter Keeton gained Test recognition, though the bowling was less effective.

Through the early fifties the team was weak. The signing of the Australian leg break bowler Bruce Dooland, arrested the decline but until the signing of the incomparable Garfield Sobers in 1968, the team was weak. Sobers hit Malcolm Nash of Glamorgan for six sixes in an over in a County Championship game at Swansea in his first season. Mike Harris scored heavily in the 1970s, including nine centuries in 1971 but apart from Barry Stead, the bowling lacked penetration.

Nottinghamshire enjoyed one of their strongest teams in the late seventies and early eighties when the New Zealand all-rounder Richard Hadlee, South African captain Clive Rice and England batsman Derek Randall led the team to the County Championship in 1981. The club's most successful season came in 1987, as Rice and Hadlee marked their departure with the double of County Championship and NatWest Trophy. Chris Broad and Tim Robinson continued the club's long tradition of batting excellence into the England team but for some years the club struggled to repeat those achievements, although they did claim a Benson & Hedges Cup in 1989 and a Sunday League title in 1991 under Robinson's captaincy. Former Warwickshire off spinner Eddie Hemmings made a significant contribution while local seam bowler Kevin Cooper was a consistent wicket taker.

The following decade was one of underachievement, but in 2004, Nottinghamshire enjoyed a highly successful season, gaining promotion to both the Frizzell County Championship Division One, after winning Division Two, and also Totesport Division One. In 2005, Nottinghamshire won their first County Championship title since 1987, New Zealand's Stephen Fleming captaining the team to victory. However, the success was not sustained in 2006 and Notts were relegated by a margin of just half a point, although they had more success in the shorter formats and ended up runners-up on their debut appearance at Twenty20 Cup finals day. In 2007, Notts won promotion back to the top flight of the County Championship, finishing second in Division Two.

In 2008, the first season of Chris Read's captaincy, they came close to winning both the County Championship and NatWest Pro40 outright, losing to Hampshire on the final day and Sussex on the final ball respectively.
In 2010, Nottinghamshire made it to Finals Day of the Friends Provident Twenty20 Cup. Drawn against Somerset, Notts lost on the Duckworth Lewis method. However, they won the County Championship on the last day, having lost the preceding two matches, with Somerset in second place tied on points but with one less win. 2013 brought a second major trophy of the Read era with victory in the YB40 one-day competition. While further titles eluded them, Notts remained a fixture in the First Division of the Championship for the next decade under Read's long-running captaincy, also featuring a number of England players including Stuart Broad, Graeme Swann, Alex Hales, James Taylor and Samit Patel. In 2017, trophy success returned to Notts. Under the captaincy of Australian Dan Christian, they won their first T20 Blast trophy beating Birmingham Bears in the final, whilst in the same season securing the Royal London One-Day Cup with victory over Surrey.

Read, by now only captaining the first-class side, retired in 2017 and was replaced as club captain by Steven Mullaney, with Christian continuing to lead the T20 side. Despite struggles in the longer game, Notts won a second T20 Blast title in 2020, beating Surrey in a rain-affected final.

Sponsorship

Players

Current squad
 No. denotes the player's squad number, as worn on the back of his shirt.
  denotes players with international caps.
  denotes a player who has been awarded a county cap.

Former players

The players with over 400 first-class appearances for the club are:
 George Gunn 583 (1902–32)
 Wilf Payton 489 (1905–31)
 John Gunn 489 (1896-1925)
 Tom Oates 420 (1897-1925)
 Arthur Carr 416 (1910–34)
 Joe Hardstaff Jr 408 (1930–55)
 Willis Walker 405 (1913–37)

The players with over 600 total club appearances (first-class, list A and twenty20; reflecting the introduction of one day county cricket in 1963) are:
 Derek Randall 800 (1971–93)
 Paul Johnson 748 (1981-2002)
 Tim Robinson 742 (1978–99)
 Chris Read 703 (1998-2017)
 Basher Hassan 614 (1966–85)
 Bruce French 603 (1976–95)

Club captains
A full list of captains of the club from its formation to the present day:

Records

Team totals

Highest total for – 791 v. Essex, Chelmsford, 2007
Highest total against – 781/7 dec by Northamptonshire, Northampton, 1995
Lowest total for – 13 v. Yorkshire, Nottingham, 1901
Lowest total against – 16 by Derbyshire, Nottingham, 1879

Batting

Highest score – 312* W. W. Keeton v. Middlesex, The Oval, 1939
Most runs in season – 2,620 W. W. Whysall, 1929

Highest partnership for each wicket

1st – 406* D. J. Bicknell and G. E. Welton v. Warwickshire, Birmingham, 2000
2nd – 402 Haseeb Hameed and B. M. Duckett v. Derbyshire, Derby, 2022
3rd – 367 W. Gunn and J. R. Gunn v. Leicestershire, Nottingham, 1903
4th – 361 A. O. Jones and J. R. Gunn v. Essex, Leyton, 1905
5th – 359 D. J. Hussey and C. M. W. Read v. Essex, Nottingham, 2007
6th – 372* K. P. Pietersen and J. E. Morris v. Derbyshire, Derby, 2001
7th – 301 C. C. Lewis and B. N. French v. Durham, Chester-le-Street, 1993
8th – 220 G. F. H. Heane and R. Winrow v. Somerset, Nottingham, 1935
9th – 170 J. C. Adams and K. P. Evans v. Somerset, Taunton, 1994
10th – 152 E. B. Alletson and W. Riley v. Sussex, Hove, 1911

Bowling

Best bowling – 10/66 K. Smales v. Gloucestershire, Stroud, 1956
Best match bowling – 17/89 F. C. L. Matthews v. Northamptonshire, Nottingham, 1923
Wickets in season – 181 B. Dooland, 1954

Honours

First XI honours
 County Championship (6) – 1907, 1929, 1981, 1987, 2005, 2010
Division Two (2) – 2004, 2022
 Gillette/NatWest/C&G Trophy (1) – 1987
 Sunday/National League (1) – 1991
 Benson & Hedges Cup (1) – 1989
 YB40 (1) – 2013
 Royal London One-Day Cup (1) – 2017
 T20 Blast (2) – 2017, 2020

Second XI honours
 Second XI Championship (3) – 1972, 1985, 2015 Second XI Trophy (1) –''' 2011

See also
 List of Nottinghamshire County Cricket Club grounds

Notes

References

External links
Notts CCC homepage
A history of cricket and cricketers in Nottinghamshire

 
1841 establishments in England
Cricket clubs established in 1841
English first-class cricket teams
Sport in Nottingham
Cricket in Nottinghamshire